Red Dawn is a 2012 American action war film directed by Dan Bradley and written by Carl Ellsworth and Jeremy Passmore. It is a remake of the 1984 film of the same name. The film stars Chris Hemsworth, Josh Peck, Josh Hutcherson, Adrianne Palicki, Isabel Lucas, and Jeffrey Dean Morgan. The film centers on a group of young people who defend their hometown from a North Korean invasion.

Metro-Goldwyn-Mayer announced its intention to remake Red Dawn in May 2008 and subsequently hired Bradley and Ellsworth. The principal characters were cast the following year and the film went into production in September 2009 in Mount Clemens, Michigan. Originally scheduled to be released on September 24, 2010 and November 24, 2010, the film was shelved because of MGM's financial troubles. While in post-production, the invading army and antagonists were changed from Chinese to North Korean in order to maintain access to the Chinese box office, though the film was still not released in China.

Because of MGM's bankruptcy, the distribution rights were sold to FilmDistrict in September 2011 and the film was released in the United States on November 21, 2012, to mostly negative reviews. The film is also a box-office failure, grossing $50.9 million against its $65 million budget.

Plot 
An introductory montage shows the fallout of an economic crisis in the European Union and a weakened NATO alliance, amid collaborative dealings between a progressively militant North Korea, now led by the young Kim Jong Un, and ultranationalist-dominated Russia. The increased deployment of U.S. troops abroad leaves the mainland vulnerable, and American infrastructure is increasingly vulnerable to the threat of a cyberattack.

U.S. Marine Jed Eckert is home on leave in Spokane, Washington. He reunites with his father, Spokane Police Sergeant Tom Eckert, and his brother, football player Matt Eckert, as well as his childhood friend Toni Walsh and her cousin Erica Martin, Matt's girlfriend. Matt's football team, the Wolverines, suffers a defeat against another team. After the game, they go to a bar but an unexpected blackout leads to them going home.

The following morning, Jed and Matt are shocked to see swarms of invading North Korean paratroopers and transport aircraft. Their father tells them to flee to their cabin in the woods while he helps the townspeople. They are joined there by Matt's friends Robert Kitner, Daryl Jenkins, Danny Jackson, siblings Julie and Greg Goodyear, a stranger named Pete, and later by Toni; Erica is captured by the North Koreans. Tensions build as the teens try to decide whether to surrender to the invaders or resist, with Pete ending up betraying their position. North Korean soldiers, under the command of Captain Cho, bring Sergeant Eckert and Daryl's father, the mayor, out to convince the group to surrender; while the mayor persuades the boys to give up, Cho executes Sergeant Eckert after he refuses to cooperate and actively encourages them to resist.

Later, Jed announces that he intends to fight and the others agree to join him, calling themselves the Wolverines after their school mascot. After acquiring weapons, establishing a base in an abandoned mine, and being trained by Jed, the Wolverines begin a series of guerrilla attacks against soldiers and collaborators, including Pete who gets killed in a bomb explosion.

As Matt manages to free Erica from her imprisonment, he jeopardizes the mission resulting in Greg's death, leading to tension between him and Jed. The North Koreans retaliate by bombarding the surrounding woods to destroy the Wolverines' base, killing Danny and Julie, with the remaining survivors fleeing deeper into the woods.

The Wolverines eventually encounter Marine Sergeant Major Andrew Tanner and two other Marines, Corporal Smith, and Sergeant Hodges. They reveal that the Russian-backed North Korean invasion used an EMP weapon that crippled the U.S. electrical grid and military, followed by landings along the east and west coasts (Camp Pendleton is hinted by the Marines as having been destroyed in the invasion, as most likely the rest of coastal Southern California), with American counterattacks eventually halting their advances, leaving an area stretching from Michigan to Montana and Alabama to Arizona as "Free America", using the Rocky Mountains in the west and the Appalachians in the east as geographic buffers, as pockets of patriotic guerrillas in the Cascades and the Sierra Nevada mountains, and in Florida continue to fight. They also reveal that Captain Cho's suitcase contains an EMP-resistant radiotelephone, that if captured would enable the U.S. command to listen in on enemy communication, and gain a tactical advantage in a counter-offensive. The Wolverines assist Tanner, Smith, and Hodges in infiltrating the local police station, the North Koreans' center of operations. They succeed in stealing the suitcase with Jed avenging his father's death by killing Cho, though Hodges is killed in the firefight.

After they successfully escape with the suitcase, the Wolverines and Marines regroup in a safe house. However, they are ambushed by Russian Spetsnaz and Jed is killed in the firefight. Matt and the rest of the group escape with the suitcase. Robert realizes that, during the escape from the police station, Daryl was tagged with a subcutaneous tracking device that the Russians used to find them. After some thought, Daryl accepts the fact that he cannot go on with them and decides to stay behind while the rest continue on to the Marines' extraction point.

Tanner and Smith depart in a UH-1 with the suitcase. The remaining Wolverines decide to stay behind and continue to fight, recruiting more members and raiding prisoner camps, with Matt now leading the effort to continue opposing the occupation. The flag of Free America is carried by patriots in a daring raid on a North Korean concentration camp in the final shot of the film.

Cast

Production
In May 2008, at the Festival de Cannes, Harry Sloan and Mary Parent from MGM announced that a remake of Red Dawn was in the early stages of pre-production, with the remake due to be directed by Dan Bradley, who had previously worked as a second unit director and stunt coordinator on films such as The Bourne Ultimatum, Spider-Man 3, Independence Day, and Quantum of Solace. MGM subsequently announced that Red Dawn would be remade "keeping in mind the post-9/11 world that we're in". Later the same month, MGM announced that Dan Bradley had been confirmed as the director with Carl Ellsworth, screenwriter of Red Eye and Disturbia, writing the updated screenplay. Ellsworth worked from a story written by Jeremy Passmore. Vincent Newman (A Man Apart) was announced as the producer. Australian Chris Hemsworth was cast in a lead role: other cast members include Josh Peck, Adrianne Palicki, Josh Hutcherson, Isabel Lucas, Edwin Hodge, and Connor Cruise.

Principal photography began September 2009 in Mount Clemens, Michigan. The closed Notre Dame High School in Harper Woods, Michigan (Greater Detroit) was used as a filming location. Mark Binelli, author of Detroit City is the Place to Be, wrote that the school cafeteria was used as the catering hall for the employees. According to photographs taken on set, the film features propaganda pamphlets, posters, and banners featuring People's Liberation Army symbols, such as the August 1 star. The posters attempt to garner support for a Chinese occupation, with slogans such as "Rebuilding Your Reputation", "Repairing Your Economy", and "Fighting Corporate Corruption".

In June 2010, release of the film was delayed by MGM's financial difficulties. The delay came amid growing controversy in China after excerpts of the script were leaked on the website The Awl. The film drew sharp criticism from the Global Times, one of the leading Chinese state-run newspapers, with headlines such as "U.S. reshoots Cold War movie to demonize China" and "American movie plants hostile seeds against China". One of the articles stated: "China can still feel U.S. distrust and fear, especially among its people. Americans' suspicions about China are the best ground for the hawks to disseminate fear and doubt, which is the biggest concern with the movie, Red Dawn."

In January 2011, the first cast photo was released along with news that MGM would release the film once their Chapter 11 restructuring is completed. Red Dawn was one of three already completed MGM projects scheduled to be released in 2011.

In March 2011, the Los Angeles Times reported that MGM changed the villains in its Red Dawn remake from Chinese to North Korean in order to maintain access to China's lucrative box office. The changes reportedly cost less than $1 million and involve changing an opening sequence summarizing the story's fictional backdrop (dropping the original storyline of Chinese "repossession" after the US defaults on loans for a North Korean invasion), re-editing two scenes, and using digital technology to change Chinese symbols and dialogue to Korean. The film's producer Trip Vinson stated: "We were initially very reluctant to make any changes, but after careful consideration we constructed a way to make a scarier, smarter and more dangerous Red Dawn that we believe improves the movie."

Soundtrack

Ramin Djawadi composed the score to the film.

Track listing
All music by Ramin Djawadi.

Release

In September 2011, it was reported that Metro-Goldwyn-Mayer was finalizing a deal with the independent studio FilmDistrict to distribute the film in the United States. In December 2011, FilmDistrict reached a deal to distribute its 2012 films including Red Dawn through Open Road Films.It was originally set to be released on November 2, 2012, but was pushed back to November 21, 2012. In September 2012, it was announced that the film would premiere on September 27, 2012, at the Alamo Drafthouse Cinema in Austin, Texas, closing out the Fantastic Fest film festival.

Red Dawn opened in theaters in the United States on November 21, 2012. The film earned $7.4 million in its first two days and finished in seventh place, earning $14.6 million in its first weekend. The film closed in theaters on February 21, 2013, grossing a total $50.9 million worldwide.

Red Dawn was released on DVD and Blu-ray on March 5, 2013, by 20th Century Fox Home Entertainment.

Reception
, on Review aggregator Rotten Tomatoes the film has an approval rating of 14% based on 141 reviews and an average score of 3.88/10. The site's critical consensus reads, "The rebooted Red Dawn lacks the original's topicality, but at least pays tribute in delivering the same short shrift to character development and general logic." On Metacritic the film has a score of 31 out of 100 based on 33 reviews, indicating "generally unfavorable reviews". The film earned a Razzie Award nomination for Worst Prequel, Remake, Rip-off or Sequel.

Frank Scheck of The Hollywood Reporter said, "An already silly premise is given a ham-fisted treatment in this ill-advised remake of John Milius' 1984 hit action film". Manohla Dargis of The New York Times said, "Bradley... handles the low-fi action well, which helps divert attention from the bargain-bin special effects, bad acting and politics". Mark Olsen of the Los Angeles Times said, "Reasonably dopey fun on its own, the remade Red Dawn simply can't stand up to the real-world issues it steps on like a land mine". Roger Ebert of the Chicago Sun-Times said, "The story's time frame is confusingly murky. How long does it take the North Koreans to land... and start running things? What is their game plan? Is this a national invasion? We're unclear what's happening in the rest of the United States". Joe Leydon of Variety wrote, "[the] battle scenes are infused with a propulsive sense of urgency, as Bradley (a vet stunt coordinator and second unit director) often achieves an effective semi-documentary look".

See also
 Tomorrow, When the War Began, a film based on a novel about Australia being invaded by an unspecified Asian enemy nation.
 Homefront, a 2011 videogame about a resistance movement in the United States after being occupied by North Korean forces, and its 2016 sequel, Homefront: The Revolution.

References

External links

 
 
 
 

2012 films
2010s war films
American action war films
Remakes of American films
American war films
Films set in Washington (state)
Films set in North Korea
Films set in 2040
Films shot in Michigan
North Korea in fiction
Films about World War III
Fiction about invasions
FilmDistrict films
Metro-Goldwyn-Mayer films
Films scored by Ramin Djawadi
Films produced by Beau Flynn
Techno-thriller films
Films shot in Detroit
2012 directorial debut films
Films about the Korean People's Army
2010s English-language films
2010s American films